Eerik Siikasaari (born 8 October 1957 in Finland) is a Finnish jazz bassist who is probably best known as a member of Trio Töykeät, a Finnish jazz trio. He is also the bassist of Espoo Big Band, and actively teaches music in Espoo-based Pop/Jazz-school Ebeli. Has won three minor awards in Finland.

External links 
Homepage of Trio Töykeät
Homepage of Espoo Big Band

1957 births
Living people
Finnish jazz musicians
Jazz double-bassists
21st-century double-bassists
Trio Töykeät members